"Ita Yúyu" (Dewflower) is a Mexican short film made in the mountains of Guerrero State, one of the poorest regions in Mexico.

Directed by Rafael de Villa Magallón (credited as RAFA devillamagallón), Ita Yúyu tells the story of a mixteca girl. Despite the death of her parents and the context she experiences every day in a small indigenous community, she hasn't lost her innocence and her hope in the world.

The story is about her life and the struggle it involves poverty, nonexistent health-care, lack of medicines and abuse are some of the issues Ita Yúyu has to deal with until she decides to fight for things that really matter.

Plot 
Ita Yuyu –Dewflower- (Martina Rojas) is a ‘mixteca’ girl who lives in the mountain region of the state of Guerrero, in South Mexico. Despite the death of her parents and the context she experiences every day in a small indigenous community, she hasn't lost her innocence and her hope in the world.

This indigenous young woman has spent five years trying to watch a videotape where her parents, who died because of an infection, appeared for the last time. Watching videotapes is not easy in her community. So she tries, once again, to watch the video when some reporters visit the place. Such a goal will change her whole life forever and she will finally go away to Mexico City.

During her search she meets with her best friend (Evelia Cortez), a quiet indigenous girl about her age who has always lived in the community; a brave man called Faustino Esteban (Taurino Rojas), her uncle and leader of an indigenous social organization; three reporters (Montserrat Oropeza, Rafael de Villa y Eduardo Paniagua) from the city who come to the region just to make a report about its situation but don't understand the reality of the place and its limitations and one of the policemen (Paulino Mendoza) who occasionally sleep with her but don't care about her concerns.

The story is about her life and the struggle it involves. poverty, inexistent healthcare, lack of medicines and abuse are some of the issues Ita Yuyu has to deal with until she decides to fight for things that ‘really matter’.

Awards and festivals 
V Festival Pantalla de Cristal.
Best Fiction Short Film
Best Casting in a Short Film

Nominated for Best Postproduction in a Short Film
Rencontres Cinémas d'Amérique Latine de Toulouse
Participation in the section Cinéma & Vidéo des Peuples Indigènes

External links 
 

Mexican short films
2003 short films
2000s Mexican films